Clethra arborea, commonly known as the lily-of-the-valley-tree, is a flowering plant in the genus Clethra. It is found in Macaronesia where it is native to Madeira, extinct in the Canary Islands, and considered an introduced species in the Azores.  In Madeira its natural habitat is laurisilva forest.

Description
It is an evergreen narrowly upright shrub or small tree, growing to about 6 m tall and 4 m wide. The foliage is dense and glossy, with the leaves up to 7–10 cm long. The flowers are small, white and fragrant, similar in appearance to those of lily of the valley, hence the common name. (Lily of the valley is not closely related, being a monocotyledon.) The flowers are grouped in terminal panicles and bloom in early to mid summer.  The plant is toxic to humans; it contains andromedotoxin which may cause diarrhea and even sudden death.

Cultivation
The tree prefers moist, acidic and well-drained soils, disliking alkaline soils. It is sensitive to frost and likely to die if the temperature falls below −3 °C. It is propagated by seeds, cuttings and air-layering.

References

Notes

Sources
 
 

arborea
Flora of Madeira
Flora of the Azores
Endemic flora of Macaronesia
Plants described in 1789